Phoebe Lankester (also Phebe Lankester, 10 April 1825 – 9 April 1900) was a British botanist known for her popular science writing, particularly on wildflowers, parasitic plants, and ferns. Her writing incorporated both technical, high-level text and writing accessible to the lay reader.

Family
She was born Phoebe Pope in Highbury to a former Manchester mill owner and his wife. She had one brother. In 1845, she married the naturalist Edwin Lankester, with whom she had eight children. Her son Ray became a zoologist.

Writing
Lankester published under the name Mrs. Lankester. Her books combined scientific rigor with interesting information about traditional medicinal uses of plants. She also lectured on science and wrote a syndicated column on women's topics that ran in provincial newspapers.

Lankester wrote a new section on popular plant knowledge for the third (1884) edition of English Botany, an enormous and influential publication that had illustrations by James Sowerby and other members of the Sowerby family.

Selected books
 A Plain and Easy Account of the British Ferns (1860)
 Wild Flowers Worth Notice (1879)
 Talks About Plants, Or, Early Lessons in Botany (1879)
 The National Thrift Reader (1880)
 British Ferns'' (1881)

References 

English botanists
English botanical writers
1825 births
1900 deaths
Women botanists
19th-century British botanists
19th-century British writers
19th-century British women scientists
19th-century British women writers